The Green Left (SF) is a democratic socialist political party in Denmark. It was formerly known in English as the Socialist People's Party, the literal translation of its Danish name.

History

1959–1969
The SF was founded on 15 February 1959 by Aksel Larsen, a former leader of the Communist Party of Denmark (DKP). Larsen was removed from the ranks of the DKP for his criticism over the Soviet intervention in the Hungarian Revolution of 1956. Larsen and the new SF sought to form a third way between Denmark's United States-oriented social democracy and Soviet Union–oriented communism, which sought to combine democracy with socialism. He was joined by a large share of the members of the DKP. They all supported the idea of independence from the Soviet Union.

In the 1960 elections, the party entered the Folketing with eleven seats. The DKP lost all six of its seats. In the 1964 elections, the party lost one seat. During the 1960s the SF became involved in the peace movement and the movements which opposed nuclear weapons and nuclear power. It sought to "walk on two legs", by combining its parliamentary work with involvement in grass roots movements.

In the 1966 elections, the Social Democrats and the SF won a combined majority in parliament, in which the SF doubled its number of seats from 10 to 20. A Social Democrat minority government was formed, which was supported by the SF. The cooperation lasted only one year, but led to considerable conflict within the SF: in 1967 the Left Socialists (VS) broke away from the SF. In the subsequent 1968 elections, the SF lost nine seats and the VS entered parliament with four. In 1969 the party chairperson Larsen stood down, he was replaced by Sigurd Ømann.

1969–1991
In the 1971 elections, the party regained ground on the VS, gaining six seats, while the VS left the Folketing. In 1972, the party participated in the referendum campaign against Denmark's entry into the European Economic Community. The Danish voters voted in favour of the European by a narrow margin. Because of its opposition to the EEC however boosted the SF's membership and support. In the subsequent 1973 "landslide" elections, the SF lost six seats (reducing the party's share to 11), and the DKP re-entered the Folketing with six seats. In 1974, Ømann stood down as party chairperson in favour of Gert Petersen. In the 1975 elections, the SF lost two seats and the VS re-entered the Folketing as well. In 1977 the party reached an all-time low with only seven seats. During the 1970s, the SF began to change its program and electoral appeal. Where it had been a male-domined workers' party it became broader left-wing political party that was oriented towards new voters and new social movements. It became more focused on the environment and gender politics.

In 1979, the party won four seats as the DKP lost its six seats. In the 1981 elections, the party almost doubled from eleven to twenty-one. In the 1984 elections it remained stable. In the 1986 referendum on the Single European Act, the SF campaigned together with the Social Democrats and the Social Liberal Party against the European Community. The SEA was adopted by a narrow margin. In the subsequent 1987, it reached its all-time peak with twenty seven seats. In 1988, it lost three seats, and in 1990, it lost another nine, leaving only fifteen. In 1991, the party chairman Petersen stood down in favour of Holger K. Nielsen. Between 1982 and 1993, a centre-right government led by Poul Schlüter formed by the Conservatives, the Liberals, and allies was in power, even though the Social Democrats, SF, and the Social Liberals formed a majority in parliament. This, combined with its links with the peace and environmental movement, gave the SF the power to force alternative security and environmental policies.

1991–2001
In 1991, Petersen stood down as party chairman; he was replaced by Holger K. Nielsen, who was – compared to the other candidate Steen Gade – closer to the party's socialist past.

In the 1992 referendum on the treaty of Maastricht, the SF campaigned for the "no"-vote. The Danish people voted against the referendum. In 1993, the SF formed a historic compromise with the other parties in the Folketing. It accepted the concessions made to the Danes in the Edinburgh Agreement and to the SF in the National Compromise. Therefore, it campaigned to vote "yes" in the second referendum. Just before the referendum in 1991, the SF's party congress had adopted a new program of action and principles, "Mod Nye Tider (Towards New Times)", which departed from the old anti-EU line. As a group in the SF became more positive of the EU, the SF became increasingly divided on the issue.

In 1994, it lost another two seats and the Red-Green Alliance an alliance which included the DKP and the VS entered parliament with six seats. In the 1998 elections the party remained stable. During the 1998 referendum on the Treaty of Amsterdam, it led the No-camp again, unsuccessfully. Between 1993 and 2001, the SF supported a Social Democrat/Social Liberal minority government led by Poul Nyrup Rasmussen.

In the 2000 referendum on the euro, the SF was part of the successful "no" campaign.

In opposition, 2001–2011
In the 2001 elections, the party lost one seat and after Liberal Party, the Conservative People's Party and the Danish People's Party gained a majority SF lost almost all political influence in parliament. There were some local bright spots with great support to SF mayors in Vejle, Them, Nakskov, Kalundborg, and Maribo caused by charismatic candidates.

In 2004, the party's sole MEP again decided to sit with The Greens–European Free Alliance group, instead of the European United Left/Nordic Green Left, leading to considerable internal conflict. The party has since then come around to her point of view, and in 2008, it was decided that future SF MEPs should sit in the Green Group, although at the time SF was still only an observer in the European Green Party and not a full member.

In the 2005 elections, SF gained the worst election result since 1979, and lost yet another seat in parliament. On election night Holger K. Nielsen stepped down as party chairman in favour of a new chair. When Holger K. Nielsen announced that he would step down as chairman, three candidates for the post came forth: Pia Olsen Dyhr, Meta Fuglsang, and Villy Søvndal. At an at times chaotic process on the party congress resulted in the decision to hold a ballot among the party members to decide who should be chairman. Søvndal, running on a platform of moving the party further to the political left won the ballot with 60% of the vote.

The election of Søvndal brought major changes to the party. Greater emphasis was placed on professionalism, the use of focus groups and a change in electoral strategy. The number of key issues was reduced to three to better penetrate in the media with fewer slogans.

In a 2006 internal referendum, 66% of the SF-members declared that the party should participate in the "yes"-camp in a referendum on the European Constitution, a historic break from its Eurosceptic past.

In the 2007 election, SF more than doubled its seats in parliament and became the fourth-largest party with increased support across the country. In itself this did not bring about any major change in political influence since the centre-right was able to maintain its majority. However the increase in votes and members of parliament brought optimism and new resources to the party. The media had also discovered Søvndal's ability to make an impact and gave him the opportunity to use that in many cases. The number of party members also greatly increased during this period.

At the 2006 party congress, Søvndal took exception to anti-democratic groups, mostly Hizb-ut-Tahrir using unusually harsh language. He repeated these statements on his blog in 2008 which led to great attention to the party and some internal criticism. Right-wing politicians praised Søvndal's statements and rhetoric which caused insecurity in some parts of the party who felt they were being embraced by some of SF's main political opponents on the right wing. The polls during these months showed a constant rise in support for the party which combined with a decline in support for the Social Democrats showed an almost equal support to the two parties. For the first time ever some polls showed greater support for SF than for the Social Democrats. In the spring of 2008 this however changed so that SF got 16% in the polls and the Social Democrats 23%.

In 2008, SF voted in favour for the national budget for 2009. This was the first time the SF had voted in favour of a national budget by the Fogh cabinet. This was widely regarded as an attempt to disprove the frequent accusations of SF not being "economically responsible".

In government, 2011–2014
Before the 2011 election, SF announced that its goal was to be part of a cabinet consisting of SF, the Social Democrats, and the Social Liberal Party. While the Social Democrats were positive to the idea the Social Liberals were initially more sceptical, due to differences in economic policies. This became a reality with the formation cabinet of Helle Thorning-Schmidt: For the first time, SF was part of a cabinet, with six cabinet ministers. In September 2012 Villy Søvndal announced that he was stepping down as chairman of the party. After a protracted election for the party chair Annette Vilhelmsen was elected chairwoman with 66% of the constituency, against the 34% achieved by her competitor Astrid Krag. Since Krag had the backing of most of the party leadership, Vilhelmsen's election was widely interpreted as a display of dissatisfaction with the leadership's approach to participating in government.

Vilhelmsen never managed to provide stable leadership for the party however. In January 2014, the party left the coalition government over a dispute involving the sale of shares in the state-owned energy company DONG Energy to Goldman Sachs, stating that they would instead provide confidence and supply. Vilhelmsen and a considerable part of the party leadership subsequently resigned. Pia Olsen Dyhr was subsequently elected new chairman of the party.

Supporting the government, 2019–2022
The 2019 general election saw a victory for the 'red bloc' consisting of the Social Democrats, Social Liberals, SF, the Red-Green Alliance, the Faroese Social Democratic Party, and Siumut. SF received 7.7% of the vote, a 3.5% increase from 2015, netting them 14 seats. Following the results, Vice President Signe Munk stepped down to serve in the Folketing and Serdal Benli was elected to take Munk's place.

Prior to the election, SF spoke with leader of the Social Democrats Mette Frederiksen and brought a list of policy demands. These included strong climate action and the abolishment of the cash assistance ceiling, though the latter was abandoned during negotiations. Ultimately it was decided that the Social Democrats would form a one-party minority government supported by SF and the rest of the red bloc.

Return to opposition, 2022–
The incumbent red bloc government won a narrow majority in the  2022 general election. However, both before and after the election, Prime Minister Frederiksen instead called for the formation of a unity government with the centre-right  Liberal Party as well as the newly formed centrist  Moderates. The formation of this grand coalition would make SF the largest party in the opposition with 15 seats, an increase of one compared to the 2019 election. 

In 2022, the congress of the party voted for the official English name of the party to be "Green Left".

Ideology and issues

SF's ideological base is socialism, inspired by green politics and democratic socialism. The party sees a democratic-socialist Denmark as the end goal of its politics. The party is a strong supporter of feminism, human rights, the rights of minorities, and democracy. An important issue dividing the party is the European Union. Historically, the party was highly Eurosceptic; during the 1990s, when the EU began to implement policies oriented at regional development, environmental protection and social protection, the SF became more positive about the EU. In 2004 the party shifted towards a more pro-European stance. Other important issues for the SF are a globalization based on solidarity. To that extent, it seeks to reform the World Trade Organization, as well as environmental protection, and support feminism.

International comparison

The SF is a Nordic Green Left party like the Swedish Left Party, the Norwegian Socialist Left Party, the Finnish Left Alliance, and the Icelandic Left-Green Movement. These were also influenced by feminism and green politics in the 1970s and 1980s. Similar parties in Western Europe were the French Unified Socialist Party and the Dutch Pacifist Socialist Party.

Relationships to other parties
The SF has good relationships with the Social Liberal Party and the Social Democrats who, in the past, have cooperated in minority governments supported from the outside by the SF, although now the party is in opposition to a centrist government.

International organizations
SF is a member of the Nordic Green Left Alliance and the European Greens. Between 1979 and 1989, its MEPs sat in the Communist and Allies Group. Between 1989 and 1994, its sole MEP was member of the European United Left parliamentary group. Between 1994 and 1999, its sole MEP sat in the Green Group. Between 1999 and 2004, its sole MEP sat in the European United Left/Nordic Green Left group. After 2004 election, SF's sole MEP, Margrete Auken, controversially chose to sit in The Greens-European Free Alliance group. SF became a full member of the Global Greens in 2014.

Organization
The SF has a strong grass-roots organization: All members can participate in the party congresses, but only delegates have voting rights. In May 2010, the party had 17,883 members. Its youth organization is the Youth of the Green Left. The linked Socialist Popular Education Organisation organizes a yearly political summer meeting for members and non-members in Livø.

Election results

Parliament

Local elections

European Parliament

Representation

Party Chairperson
The chairman of the SF has always been its party leader, which can't be taken for granted in Danish party politics.
 Aksel Larsen, 1959–1968
 Sigurd Ømann, 1968–1974
 Gert Petersen, 1974–1991
 Holger K. Nielsen, 1991–2005
 Villy Søvndal, 2005–2012
 Annette Vilhelmsen, 2012–2014
 Pia Olsen Dyhr, 2014–present

Members of the Folketing
The party currently has 15 members of the Danish parliament. In the 2022 elections, SF gained 1 seat, and won 15 seats in total, the best result with Pia Olsen Dyhr as leader to date.
 Sigurd Agersnap
 Kirsten Normann Andersen
 Theresa Berg Andersen
 Lisbeth Bech-Nielsen
 Anne Valentina Berthelsen
 Marianne Bigum
 Astrid Carøe
 Karina Lorentzen Dehnhardt
 Pia Olsen Dyhr
 Karsten Hønge
 Sofie Lippert
 Jacob Mark
 Signe Munk
 Charlotte Broman Mølbæk
 Carl Valentin

Members of the European Parliament
The SF has always been represented in the European Parliament. It gained one seat in 1979, 1984 (one additional seat on 1 January 1985), 1989 and 2004. Since 2004, the elected candidate was Margrete Auken. Without the approval of the party's board, she joined The Greens–European Free Alliance parliamentary group, instead of the European United Left/Nordic Green Left in 2004. Since then, the party has come around to her point of view, and at the national congress in 2008, it was decided that future SF MEPs will stay in the Greens–EFA group in the European Parliament, but SF will only join the European Green Party as an observer, and not as a member. In the 2009 European elections, the party increased its share of votes to 15,6%, and got an additional seat which went to Emilie Turunen, who became a member of the Social Democrats in March 2013.
For the 2019 European Election, SF won back the 2nd seat and is now also represented by Kira Marie Peter-Hansen, who is the youngest parliamentarian ever elected for the European Parliament.

Municipal and regional government
Currently the party has approximately 236 elected representatives in local town councils and 21 representatives in Denmark's fourteen regional councils. During the 1990s, the party gained its first mayors.

Former Members of the Folketing

2005–2007
 Anne Baastrup
 Steen Gade
 Pernille Vigsø Bagge
 Poul Henrik Hedeboe
 Anne Grete Holmsgaard
 Morten Homann
 Kristen Touborg Jensen
 Holger K. Nielsen
 Kamal Qureshi
 Ole Sohn
 Villy Søvndal

2007–2011
 Anne Baastrup
 Anne Grete Holmsgaard
 Astrid Krag
 Eigil Andersen
 Flemming Bonne
 Hanne Agersnap
 Holger K. Nielsen
 Ida Auken
 Jesper Petersen
 Jonas Dahl
 Kamal Qureshi
 Karina Lorentzen
 Karl Bornhøft
 Karsten Hønge
 Kristen Touborg
 Nanna Westerby
 Ole Sohn
 Pernille Frahm
 Pernille Vigsø Bagge
 Pia Olsen Dyhr
 Steen Gade
 Villy Søvndal
 Özlem Cekic

Elected in 2011 and left the party
 Astrid Krag
 Ida Auken
 Jesper Petersen
 Ole Sohn

2015–2019 

 Holger K. Nielsen
 Lisbeth Bech Poulsen
 Pia Olsen Dyhr
 Jacob Mark
 Trine Torp
 Karsten Hønge
 Kirsten Normann Andersen (took former MP Jonas Dahl's seat as he left the Folketing)

See also
 Green party
 Green politics
 List of environmental organizations
 Popular socialism

References

External links
Official website
SF

1959 establishments in Denmark
Ecosocialist parties
European Green Party
The Greens–European Free Alliance
Feminism in Denmark
Global Greens member parties
Green political parties in Denmark
Nordic Green Left Alliance
Political parties established in 1959
Socialist parties in Denmark